Saint Mark's relics, the putative remains of Mark the Evangelist, are held in St Mark's Basilica in Venice, Italy.

Venice

Legends

'Translatio' 
Saint Mark was martyred and initially buried in the Baucalis section of Alexandria in Egypt. His relics are recorded in Venice as early as the ninth-century in both the will of Doge Giustiniano Participazio and the travelogue of a Frankish monk on return from a pilgrimage to the Holy Land.

As narrated, a fleet of ten Venetian trading vessels seeks shelter in the Muslim-controlled city of Alexandria during a storm. This is said to be 'by the will of God'; hence there is no intentional violation of the edict of Emperor Leo V that forbids commercial contact with the Muslims. In Alexandria, two of the Venetian merchants, Buono da Malamocco (Metamaucum) and Rustico da Torcello, go daily to pray at the tomb of Saint Mark, located in a church near the port, and there, they make the acquaintance of Theodore and Stauracius, a priest and monk respectively. Theodore, fearful for the dwindling Christian community under Islamic rule, makes it known that the Caliph Al-Ma'mun has ordered the demolition of the church in order to recover building materials for new mosques, and it is suggested that the body of the saint be safely removed to Venice. To avoid raising suspicion, the body is first substituted with the remains of Saint Claudia, which are present in the church. The relics, placed into a basket and covered in pork, are then successfully smuggled past the Muslim customs officials and embarked on the Venetians' ship, which is preserved from shipwreck during the voyage by Saint Mark who appears and warns the sailors of the imminent danger. Other miracles occur, confirming the authenticity of the relics, until finally the ship arrives in Venice where the body is received by the Bishop of Olivolo and then taken in solemn procession to the Doge.

Independently of the pious inventions, the overall narration serves to justify the right of Venice to possess the relics. It simultaneously affirms the primacy of the Venetian church, the rightful successor of the Patriarchate of Aquileia, even over the ancient metropolitan see of Alexandria. As Buono and Rustico declare, evoking the tradition that Mark preached in northern Italy, the Venetians are the "first-born sons" of the Evangelist. The translation of the relics to Venice is therefore a return of Mark to his rightful resting place.

Donald Nicol explained this act as "motivated as much by politics as by piety", and "a calculated stab at the pretensions of the Patriarchate of Aquileia." Instead of being used to adorn the church of Grado, which claimed to possess the throne of Saint Mark, it was kept secretly by Doge Giustiniano Participazio in his modest palace. Possession of Saint Mark's remains was, in Nicol's words, "the symbol not of the Patriarchate of Grado, nor of the bishopric of Olivolo, but of the city of Venice." In his will, Doge Giustiniano asked his widow to build a basilica dedicated to Saint Mark, which was erected between the palace and the chapel of Saint Theodore Stratelates, who until then had been patron saint of Venice.

'Praedestinatio' 
Traceable to Martino da Canal's thirteenth century , the legend in its definitive form narrates that Saint Mark, after his mission to northern Italy and the evangelization of Aquileia, returns to Rome. Passing through the Venetian Lagoon, he beaches his boat for the night, and he has a vision on the very site of the future city of Venice in which an angel appears, greeting him "Peace to you Mark, my Evangelist". A prophecy follows announcing that his body will one day find rest in Venice and that it will be venerated by a virtuous and pious people who will build a glorious and eternal city.

'Inventio' 
The  (also ) confirms the special bond between Saint Mark and the Venetians. The legend concerns the rediscovery of the body at the time of the reconstruction of the church in the eleventh century. Although it is found no earlier than Martino da Canal's thirteenth-century , it may derive from the actual public exposition of Saint Mark's relics prior to their entombment in the new crypt. As narrated, the body of Saint Mark is hidden to prevent theft during work on the church, and after years all knowledge of its hiding place, known only to the Doge and a few trusted officials, is lost. Finally, after three days of fasting and prayer, an earthquake breaks open a pillar, revealing the body, which in later variations reaches out to the pious Venetians.

Tomb

Alexandria and Cairo
The Coptic church believes that the head of Saint Mark remains in a church named after him in Alexandria, and parts of his relics are in Saint Mark's Coptic Orthodox Cathedral, Cairo. Every year, on the 30th day of the month of Paopi, the Coptic Orthodox Church celebrates the commemoration of the consecration of the church of Saint Mark, and the appearance of the head of the saint in the city of Alexandria. This takes place inside St Mark's Coptic Orthodox Cathedral in Alexandria.

In June 1968, Pope Cyril VI of Alexandria sent an official delegation to Rome to receive a relic of Saint Mark from Pope Paul VI. The delegation consisted of ten metropolitans and bishops, seven of whom were Coptic and three Ethiopian, and three prominent Coptic lay leaders. The relic was said to be a small piece of bone that had been given to the Roman pope by Giovanni Cardinal Urbani, Patriarch of Venice. Pope Paul, in an address to the delegation, said that the rest of the relics of the saint remained in Venice. The delegation received the relic on June 22, 1968. The next day, the delegation celebrated a pontifical liturgy in the Church of Saint Athanasius the Apostolic in Rome. The metropolitans, bishops, and priests of the delegation all served in the liturgy. Members of the Roman papal delegation, Copts who lived in Rome, newspaper and news agency reporters, and many foreign dignitaries attended the liturgy.

Braga (Portugal)

In Braga (Portugal) there is a tomb in Saint Mark's church attributed to Saint Mark.

References

Notes

Citations

Bibliography
 
 
 

Burials at Saint Mark's Coptic Orthodox Cathedral (Alexandria)
Body snatching
Christian relics
Burials in Portugal